Claire Jennifer Koski (born 13 March 1991) is an Australian cricketer who plays for the ACT Meteors and the Melbourne Renegades.  She has previously played for the New South Wales Breakers and Sydney Thunder, and was a member of Australia's 2014 World Cup-winning women's indoor cricket team  . Claire was educated at Macarthur Anglican School in Camden where she was the only female team member who played in the school's 1st Eleven.

An all-rounder, Koski bats in the top-order, bowls fast medium-pace, and is also an accomplished wicketkeeper.

In November 2018, she was named in the Melbourne Renegades' squad for the 2018–19 Women's Big Bash League season.

References

External links

1991 births
ACT Meteors cricketers
Australian women cricketers
Cricketers from New South Wales
Living people
Melbourne Renegades (WBBL) cricketers
New South Wales Breakers cricketers
Sportswomen from New South Wales
Sydney Thunder (WBBL) cricketers